There are 4,466 hospitals in Mexico.
67% of hospitals are private and the remaining 33% are public.  The most important public hospital institutions are the Secretariat of Health (Secretaria de Salud), Mexican Social Security Institute (IMSS) and Institute for Social Security and Services for State Workers (ISSSTE). These form an integral part of the Mexican healthcare system.

This is a list of hospitals in Mexico.

Mexico City
American British Cowdray Medical Center - Mexico City, DF
American British Cowdray Medical Center SANTA FE CAMPUS, Mexico City DF MEXICO
Centro Médico Nacional Siglo XXI - Av. Cuauhtémoc No. 330, entre Dr. Márquez y Dr. Morones, Col. Doctores, Del. Cuauhtémoc
Fundacion Hospital Nuestra Señora de la Luz - E. Montes 135, col. San Rafael, CP 06030.
Médica Sur - Mexico City DF MEXh
Médica Sur Lomas - Acueducto Rio Hondo No. 20 Col. Lomas Virreyes - Mexico City DF MEXICO
Instituto Nacional de Cancerología INCAN - México DF City MEX
Instituto Nacional de Ciencias Medicas y Nutricion Salvador Zubiran INNSZ - Tlalpan, México City DF MEX
Instituto Nacional de Neurología y Neurocirugía Manuel Velasco Suárez (INNN) - Insurgentes Sur, Mexico City
Instituto Nacional de Perinatología INPer - Mexico City, DF
Cirugía del Valle -Mexico City, DF
Hospital Ángeles Mexico- Mexico City, DF
Hospital Ángeles Lindavista - Mexico City, DF
 - Mexico City, DF
Hospital Ángeles Mocel - Mexico City, DF
Hospital MAC Periferico Sur  - Mexico City, DF
Hospital Ángeles Lomas - Mexico City, DF
Hospital Ángeles Metropolitano - Mexico City, DF
Hospital Ángeles Clínica Londres - Mexico City, DF
Hospital de Especialidades Dr. Belisario Domínguez SSGDF - Mexico City, DF
Hospital Español - Mexico City, DF
Hospital General de México - Mexico City, DF

Hospital Central Militar - Lomas de Sotelo, Mexico City DF
Hospital General Dr. Enrique Cabrera SSGDF - Mexico City, DF
Hospital General Dr. Gregorio Salas SSGDF - Mexico City, DF
Hospital General Dr. Rubén Leñero SSGDF - Mexico City, DF
Hospital General Iztapalapa SSGDF - Mexico City, DF
Hospital General La Villa SSGDF - Mexico City, DF
Hospital General Milpa Alta SSGDF - Mexico City, DF
Hospital General Ticomán SSGDF - Mexico City, DF
Hospital General Xoco SSGDF - Mexico City, DF
Hospital General Balbuena SSGDF - Mexico City, DF
Hospital Pediatrico Tacubaya SSGDF - Mexico City, DF
Hospital Pediatrico Coyoacán SSGDF - Mexico City, DF
Hospital Pediatrico Legaria SSGDF - Mexico City, DF
Hospital Pediatrico Iztapalapa SSGDF - Mexico City, DF
Hospital Pediatrico Villa SSGDF - Mexico City, DF
Hospital Materno Infantil Cuautepec SSGDF - Mexico City, DF

Hospital Psiquiátrico Fray Bernardino Álvarez - Tlalpan, Mexico City, DF
Hospital Materno-Infantil Inguarán - Mexico City, DF
Hospital Infantil de México Federico Gómez - Mexico City, DF
Hospital Juárez de México - Mexico City, DF
Hospital Central Vértiz Navarte - Dr. Vértiz 995, Col. Vértiz Narvarte, CP 03020
Hospital de México - Agrarismo 208, Col. Escandón, 11800 México, DF.
Hospital Español Sociedad de Beneficencia Española I - AV. EJÉRCITO NACIONAL 613 COL. GRANADA C.P.11560
Hospital Infantil Privado SA de CV - RIO BECERRA 97 COL. NAPOLES C.P.03810
Hospital María José SA de CV - LAS AGUILAS 101 103 COL. SAN ANGEL C.P.01010
Hospital Merlos SA de CV - AVE ESTADIO AZTECA NO 179 COL. CARACOL C.P.04660
Hospital MIG SA de CV - RÍO BAMBA 800 COL. LINDAVISTA C.P.07300
Hospital Santa Coleta - SATURNINO HERRAN 59 - S COL. SN JOSE INSURGENTES C.P.03900
Hospital Santa Elena - QUERÉTARO 58 COL. ROMA C.P.06700
Hospital Santa Fe SA de CV - SAN LUIS POTOSÍ 143 PB COL. ROMA NTE C.P.06700
Hospital Santa Mónica - TEMISTOCLES 210 COL. POLANCO C.P.11550
Hospital Tehuantepec - TEHUANTEPEC 139 COL. ROMA SUR C.P.06760
Hospital Gineco-Obstetricia # 4 -Río Magdalena No. 289 y Av. Revolución Col. Tizapán San Ángel Del. Álvaro Obregón
Hospital General de Zona # 8 -Río Magdalena No. 289 y Av. RevoluciónCol. Tizapán San Ángel Del. Álvaro Obregón
Hospital de Urgencias Traumatológicas -Torres Adalid 1305, esq. Pestalozzi Col. Del Valle Del. Benito Juárez,
Hospital General de Zona Los Venados - Municipio Libre No. 270, Esq. División del Norte, Col. Portales, Del. Benito Juárez,
Hospital Infantil Universitario - Universidad Autónoma de Coahuila, Torreón, Coah.
Hospital Psiquiátrico -Calzada de Tlalpan No. 931, Col. Niños Héroes de Chapultepec, Del. Benito Juárez
Hospital Regional #1, Gabriel Mancera - Gabriel Mancera No. 222 Esq. Xola, Col. Del Valle, Del. Benito Juárez
Hospital General de Zona # 32 - Calzada del Hueso s/n Esq. División del Norte, Col. Villa Coapa, Del. Coyoacán,
Hospital General de Zona # 27 - Eje Central Lázaro Cárdenas 445, Col. Unidad Nonoalco Tlatelolco, Del. Cuauhtémoc
Tlatelolco -Eje Central No. 445, entre Manuel González y Flores Magón, U.H. Nonoalco Tlatelolco, Del. Cuauhtémoc
Hospital Centro Médico Nacional La Raza - Calzada Vallejo y Jacarandas, Col. La Raza, Del. Gustavo A. Madero
Hospital Magdalena de Las Salinas - Av. Fortuna e Instituto Politecnico Nacional, Col. Magdalena de Las Salinas Del. Gustavo A. Madero
Hospital General de Zona # 30 - Av. Plutarco Elías Calles No. 473, Col. Santa Anita, Del. Iztacalco
Hospital General de Zona # 25 - Calzada Ignacio Zaragoza No. 1840, Col. Juan Escutia, Del. Iztapalapa
Hospital General de Zona # 47 - Combate de Celaya y Campaña de Lí¬bano, Col. Unidad Habitacional Vicente Guerrero, Del. Iztapalapa
Hospital General Universitario - Universidad Autónoma de Coahuila, Av. Juarez 900 Ote, Torreón, Coahuila
Hospital Psiquiátrico San Fernando - Av. San Fernando No. 201, Col. Toriello Guerra, Del. Tlalpan
Hospital General de Zona Francisco del Paso - Añil No. 144, Esq. Francisco del Paso y Troncoso, Col. Granjas México, Del. Iztacalco
Mexico City Shriners Hospital - Mexico City, DF
Hospital Obregón - on Av. Álvaro Obregon Colonia Roma Mexico City
Sanatorio Malinalco SA de CV - Hidalgo 45, Col. Azcapotzalco, CP 02000
Sanatorio Moisés Lira - Boston 98, Col. Nochebuena, CP 03720
Sanatorio Rougier AC - Revolución 380, Col. San Pedro de los Pinos, CP 01180
Sanatorio Santa Teresa Zacatecas SA de CV - ZACATECAS 124 COL. ROMA C.P.06700
Sanatorio Vista Alegre SA de CV - MONTES 60 COL. PORTALES C.P.03300
Sanatorio Oftalmológico Mérida SA de CV - CHIHUAHUA 71 COL. ROMA C.P.06700
Sanatorio DEL POTRO NUMERO ONCE

Quintana Roo
Amerimed Hospital - Cancún, Quintana Roo
Galenia Hospital -Cancun, Quintana Roo
Hospital Amat - Cancún, Quintana Roo
Hospital Americano - Cancún, Quintana Roo
Regional Hospital - Cancún, Quintana Roo
Hospiten International Hospital Group, Cancún y Riviera Maya, Quintana roo
Quirurgica del Sur -Cancun, Quintana Roo

Jalisco
Amerimed Hospital - Puerto Vallarta, Jalisco
Hospital Civiles - Guadalajara, Jalisco
Hospital Ángeles del Carmen - Guadalajara, Jalisco
Hospital Mexico Americano - Guadalajara, Jalisco
Santa Maria Chapalita- Guadalajara, Jalisco
Hospital San Javier - Guadalajara, Jalisco
Hospital San Javier Marina - Puerto Vallarta, Jalisco
Hospital Angel Leaño - Guadalajara, Jalisco
Hospital Ramon Garibay - Guadalajara, Jalisco
Hospital Terranova - Guadalajara, Jalisco
Hospital Real San Jose - Guadalajara, Jalisco
Hospital MAC Guadalajara  - Bernardette - Guadalajara, Jalisco
Centro Médico Puerta de Hierro - Guadalajara, Jalisco
Centro Medico Nacional de Occidente CMNO IMSS - Guadalajara, Jalisco

Aguascalientes
Hospital MAC - CMQ [ - Aguascalientes, Aguascalientes

Baja California
Amerimed Hospital - Cabo San Lucas, Baja California
Amerimed Hospital - San José de los Cabos, Baja California
Grupo Medico de La Piedad Centro, S.C. - Tijuana, Baja California
Grupo Médico de la Piedad S. de R.L. de C.V. Tijuana, Baja California.
Centro Hospitalario Internacional Pacifico - Tijuana, Baja California
Centro Medico Excel - Tijuana, Baja California

Hospital Ángeles - Tijuana, Baja California
Hospital Guadalajara - Tijuana, Baja California
Hospital Almater -Mexicali, Baja California
Weight Loss Hospital - Tijuana, Baja California
Hospital MAC Mexicali  - Mexicali, Baja California
Clínica Macuspana - Mexicali, Baja California
Hospital HispanoAmericano - Mexicali, Baja California
Hospital San Angel -Mexicali, Baja California
Hospital de las Californias -Mexicali, Baja California
Hospital del Desierto -Mexicali, Baja California
Hospital San Andrés - Mexicali, Baja California
Sanoviv Medical Institute - Rosarito Beach, Baja California

Chihuahua
Hospital Ángeles - Ciudad Juarez
Hospital Cima - Chihuahua

Sinaloa
Hospital Ángeles - Culiacan

Guanajuato
Hospital Ángeles - Leon
Hospital Aranda de la Parra - Leon
Hospital MAC  Celaya - Celaya, Guanajuato
Hospital MAC  Irapuato - Irapuato, Guanajuato
Hospital MAC  SMA - San Miguel de Allende, Guanajuato

Puebla
Hospital Ángeles - Puebla
Hospital MAC  Puebla - Puebla, Puebla

Querétaro
Hospital Ángeles - Querétaro
Hospital General de Querétaro
Hospital de Especialidades
Hospital IMSS
Hospital ISSSTE
Hospital San José
Hospital San José Sur
Hospital Médica Tec 100
Hospital de la Santa Cruz
Hospital del Sagrado Corazón
Hospital Santiago de Querétaro

Michoacán

Morelia
Hospital Psiquiatricos- Morelia (Miguel Arreola 450 Poblado Ocousen, 58279 Morelia, Michoacán, Mexico)
Hospital Ángeles Morelia
Hospital Memorial
Hospital de la Luz

Zamora
Hospital Santa María - Zamora
Hospital Municipal

Uruapan
Hospital San Miguel
Hospital Fray San Juan

Pétzcuaro
Hospital San José
IMSS Patzcuaro
Clinica Don Vasco

Lázaro Cárdenas
Hospital General 
Hospital IMSS 
ISSTEE Lázaro Cárdenas

Apatzingan
Hospital Apatzingan
Hospital IMSS Apatzingan

Sahuayo
Hospital Santa María Sahuayo
Hospital ISSTEE Sahuayo
Hospital Futura Medica 
Hospital Sagrado Corazon

Nuevo Leon
Hospital Sierra Madre - Monterrey, Nuevo León
Hospital Santa Engracia - Monterrey, Nuevo León
Hospital San José Tec de Monterrey - Monterrey, Nuevo León
Hospital Oca - Monterrey, Nuevo León
Doctors Hospital - Monterrey, Nuevo León
Hospital Zambrano Hellion - Monterrey, Nuevo León
Hospital Christus Muguerza  - Monterrey, Nuevo León

Oaxaca
Hospital General Aurelio Valdivieso - Oaxaca, Oaxaca

Sonora
HERMOSILLO
Hospital General del Estado de Sonora.
Hospital Infantil del Estado de Sonora.
Hospital Integral de la Mujer del Estado de Sonora, Hermosillo.
Instituto Mexicano del Seguro Social, Hospital General de Zona No. 2, Hermosillo.
Instituto Mexicano del Seguro Social, Hospital General de Zona No. 14, Hermosillo.
Hospital San José, Hermosillo.
Sanatorio Licona, Hermosillo.
Hospital CIMA Hermosillo 
Hospital San José
CIUDAD OBREGÓN 
Instituto Mexicano del Seguro Social, Hospital General Regional No. 1.
Instituto Mexicano del Seguro Social, Unidad Médica de Alta Especialidad No. 2.
NAVOJOA
Clinica Hospital San José de Navojoa, Navojoa, Sonora MEXICO 
Sanatorio Lourdes, Navojoa, Sonora MEXICO

Coahuila
Sanatorio Español, Torreon, Coahuila 
Hospital Ángeles - Torreon

Tabasco
 Hospital AIR - Villahermosa
 Hospital Ángeles - Villahermosa
 Hospital del Sureste - Villahermosa
 Hospital Nuestra Señora de Guadalupe - Villahermosa
 Hospital Privado Santa Fe - Villahermosa

Nayarit
Hospital General de Zona numero 1 "Luis Ernesto Miramontes Cardenas" del IMSS - Tepic

Veracruz 

 Hospital Español de Veracruz (Sociedad Española de Beneficencia de Veracruz) 
 Hospital Regional de Alta Especialidad
 Hospital General de Boca del Río
 Instituto Mexicano del Seguro Social

References

 List
Hospitals
M
Mexico
Hospitals